Jay Harris (born 25 August 1990) is a Welsh professional boxer who has held the Commonwealth flyweight title since 2017 and previously the European flyweight title in 2019.

Early life
Harris was born on 25 August 1990 in Swansea, growing up in the Townhill area of the city. He is the son of former British featherweight champion, Peter Harris, who is also his trainer. Harris began boxing at the age of 12 after going to the gym with a friend. Alongside boxing, he works part-time at Amazon.

Professional career
Harris made his professional debut on 27 July 2013 at the Newport Centre, Wales, scoring a four-round points decision (PTS) victory over Brett Fidoe.

After compiling a record of 9–0 (6 KO), he challenged Thomas Essomba for the Commonwealth flyweight title on 24 February 2017 at the York Hall, London. The fight was televised live on BoxNation, with Harris winning via unanimous decision (UD) over twelve rounds. The judges' scorecards read 117–112, 116–113 and 115–114. Following three more wins, one by knockout (KO), he made the first defence of his Commonwealth title against Ross Murray on 3 November 2018 at the York Hall. Harris successfully retained his title with a third-round technical knockout (TKO).

After a six-round PTS win over Brett Fidoe in March 2019, he next fought former world title challenger Angel Moreno on 1 June at the Vale Sports Arena in Cardiff, with the vacant European flyweight title on the line. All three judges scored the bout in favour of Harris, with the scorecards reading 120–108, 119–109 and 117–111, awarding Harris the European title via UD.

Four months later, he faced two-time Olympic bronze medalist and former world title challenger Paddy Barnes on 11 October at the Ulster Hall, Belfast, for the vacant IBF Inter-Continental flyweight title. The fight was streamed live on ESPN+ in the United States and globally through YouTube channel iFL TV, with Harris capturing his third professional title with a fourth-round KO. Harris, being the bigger of the two, used the height and reach difference to his advantage, boxing at range with sharp jabs and straight right hands. In the final 60 seconds of round one, Harris landed a straight right hand to stun Barnes and send the former three-time Olympian reeling into the ropes. After a follow up attack by Harris, Barnes fired back with a rapid ten punch combination, all of which were taken on the gloves by Harris. Round two saw much of the same, Harris staying at range, continuing to land jabs and straight right hands to the head with Barnes having little success. The third was an action packed round. With Harris electing to fight at close quarters, Barnes began finding the target with hooks to the head and body, opening a cut above Harris' right eye. In the final minute of the round, Harris landed a left hook to the body that dropped Barnes to undo the Irishman's previous success. He raised to his feet before the referee's count of ten to see out the remainder of the round. The end came in the round four. With Harris going back to fighting at range, Barnes took punishment throughout, finally being dropped with a left hook to the midsection. Unable to beat the count of ten, the fight was stopped with 48 seconds remaining.

Harris was scheduled to challenge the WBC flyweight champion Julio Cesar Martinez on 29 February 2020, at The Ford Center at The Star in Frisco, Texas, his first fight outside of the British Isles. Martinez justified his role as the 7/1 favorite, beating Harris by unanimous decision, with scores of 118-109, 116-111, and 115-112. Harris suffered a cut above his left eye in the second round, and was knocked down in the tenth round. 

Harris faced the former BBBofC English flyweight champion Marcel Braithwaite on 18 October 2020, at the Production Park Studios in South Kirkby, England. Harris won the fight by a dominant unanimous decision, with scores of 98-92, 98-93 and 97-93. After successfully rebounding from his first professional loss, Harris was scheduled to face Ricardo Rafael Sandoval in an IBF flyweight title eliminator, in the main event of a DAZN card, on 25 June 2021. Although he entered the bout as a slight betting favorite, Harris lost the fight by an eight round knockout. Harris was knocked down twice in the eight round, both time with body strikes, with Harris failing to rise in time to beat the eight count following the second knockdown.

Harris faced the undefeated Hector Gabriel Flores for the vacant WBA Inter-Continental light-flyweight title on 26 November 2021, in the main event of an MTF Fight Night event. Harris lost the fight by a sixth-round knockout. Just as in his previous bout, he was dropped twice with body strikes, and failed to beat the count after the second knockdown.

Professional boxing record

References

External links

Living people
1990 births
Welsh male boxers
Boxers from Swansea
Flyweight boxers
Commonwealth Boxing Council champions
European Boxing Union champions